Ahmadluy-e Olya (also Romanized as Aḩmadlūy-e ‘Olyā; also known as Aḩmadlū-ye Bālā and Aḩmadlū-ye ‘Olyā) is a village in Garamduz Rural District, Garamduz District, Khoda Afarin County, East Azerbaijan Province, Iran. At the 2006 census, its population was 248, in 46 families.

References 

Populated places in Khoda Afarin County